"Beautiful Mistakes" is a song by American band Maroon 5 featuring American rapper Megan Thee Stallion. It was released through 222 and Interscope Records on March 3, 2021, as the third single from the band's seventh studio album, Jordi. The song was written by the band's lead singer Adam Levine, Megan Thee Stallion, Jacob Kasher Hindlin, Joe Kirkland, and producers Andrew Goldstein & Blackbear. The music video was directed by Sophie Muller.

Composition 
"Beautiful Mistakes" is a guitar-driven pop rock song with heavy drums and atmospheric synths and a tranquil beat. The song is written in the key of B-flat major with a tempo of 99 beats per minute. Thee Stallion delivers a slow and melodic verse, and switches from rapping to singing halfway through.

Release and promotion
The song was revealed along with its title, cover art, and release date on February 22, 2021. The official lyric video was released alongside the song on March 3, 2021. The official music video premiered on MTV on March 11, 2021, and was directed by Sophie Muller.

Reception 
The song received mixed to negative reviews from critics. Variety included it in their list of the worst songs of 2021, saying that "this hookup between two of the M’s in the address book of music’s most eager-to-collaborate stars is evidence of the avalanche of pop/rap duets where both the performers and their characters don’t sound like they exist in the same universe".

Live performances 
On March 30, 2021, Maroon 5 performed "Beautiful Mistakes" for the first time in a virtual concert as part of the American Express Unstaged series. The band continued with the song live in Jimmy Kimmel Live! on April 21, and the 3000th episode in the eighteenth season of The Ellen DeGeneres Show on April 29, 2021, respectively. The band played "Beautiful Mistakes" for the season 20 finale of the reality show The Voice.

On June 14, 2021, Maroon 5 performed the song on iHeartRadio Album Release Party to commemorate the release of Jordi.

Personnel 
Credits adapted from Tidal.

 Adam Levine – lead vocals, songwriter
 Andrew Goldstein – songwriter, producer, guitar, keyboards, programming
 Jacob Kasher Hindlin – songwriter
 Joe Kirkland – songwriter
 Blackbear – songwriter, producer, keyboards, programming
 Megan Thee Stallion – featured vocals, songwriter
 James Valentine – guitar
 Serban Ghenea – engineer, mixer
 Noah "Mailbox" Passovoy – recording engineer, vocal producer
 Sam Schamberg – assistant recording engineer
 Shawn "Source" Jarrett – vocal engineer
 Randy Merrill – mastering engineer

Charts

Weekly charts

Monthly charts

Year-end charts

Certifications

Release history

References

2021 songs
2021 singles
Maroon 5 songs
Megan Thee Stallion songs
Songs written by Adam Levine
Songs written by Blackbear (musician)
Songs written by Megan Thee Stallion
222 Records singles
Interscope Records singles
Music videos directed by Sophie Muller
Pop-rap songs